Alfred Gough (born August 22, 1967) is an American screenwriter, producer and showrunner.

He is best known as co-creator of The CW's Superman prequel television series Smallville, as well as co-creating Netflix's Tim Burton's The Addams Family spin-off television series Wednesday. Alongside longtime writing/producing partner Miles Millar, Gough also co-created AMC's wuxia-influenced dystopian television series Into the Badlands and the epic fantasy series The Shannara Chronicles (based on The Sword of Shannara Trilogy book trilogy by Terry Brooks). Among his many feature film credits are Tom Dey's Shanghai Noon, Sam Raimi's Spider-Man 2 and Rob Cohen's The Mummy: Tomb of the Dragon Emperor.

Early life
Born in Leonardtown, Maryland, Gough graduated from St. Mary's Ryken High School (1985) and The Catholic University of America (1989). Gough attended The Peter Stark Producing Program at the University of Southern California where he teamed up with his writing partner Miles Millar.

Gough and Millar sold their first script while still studying at USC. "Mango", a buddy-cop story where a cop who was allergic to animals was paired with an orangutan, sold to New Line Cinema for $400,000. The film was never made, but launched the duo's professional careers.

Career
Gough and Miles Millar are prolific writers/producers. Their feature credits include the action-adventure The Mummy: Tomb of the Dragon Emperor, the hit action-comedy Shanghai Noon, as well as its sequel Shanghai Knights, Spider-Man 2 directed by Sam Raimi, Herbie: Fully Loaded, Lethal Weapon 4, and I Am Number Four. They also produced Hannah Montana: The Movie, based on the smash hit Disney Channel series. The feature marked the first for the duo's production studio, Millar-Gough Ink.

Gough and Millar’s work also spans the world of television. The duo created and served as executive producers/showrunners for the critically acclaimed action-adventure series Smallville, which aired from 2001-2011. Smallville is the longest-running comic book-based series of all time and was the top show in the history of the WB Television Network. Gough and Millar left the series in 2008, after seven seasons, breaking the news of their departure with an open letter posted to a Smallville fan site. In 2010, Gough and Millar filed a multimillion-dollar lawsuit against the WB Television Network, claiming the company had licensed Smallville to its co-owned WB and CW networks for excessively low fees, thereby cutting Gough and Millar out of tens of millions of dollars. The lawsuit was finally settled in May 2013, mere weeks before a scheduled June trial; the terms of the settlement were not made to the public. 

In 2015 Gough and Millar created The Shannara Chronicles an epic fantasy television series for MTV. It is an adaptation of The Sword of Shannara trilogy of fantasy novels by Terry Brooks. It follows three heroes as they protect an ancient tree to stop the escape of banished demons. The series was filmed in the Auckland Film Studios and on location elsewhere in New Zealand. The series starred Austin Butler, Ivana Baquero and Manu Bennett. Jon Favreau was one of the executive producers along with Dan Farrah. The pilot episode was directed by Jonathan Liebesman.

The first season of The Shannara Chronicles premiered on MTV in the United States on January 5, 2016, and consisted of 10 episodes. MTV originally greenlit a second season in April 2016; however, in May 2017, it was announced that the series would relocate to Spike (now Paramount Network). The second season premiered on October 11, 2017, and concluded November 22, 2017. On January 16, 2018, it was announced that the series had been cancelled after two seasons and that the producers were shopping the series to other networks. The series was later considered officially concluded but has since generated a cult following on Netflix.

In June 2015 Gough and Millar began production of Into the Badlands a series they created for AMC Networks. The martial arts drama was set in a gun free post apocalyptic America where warring barons had personal armies of lethally trained fighters. The series was notable as one of the only hour long dramas in American television history to feature an Asian American (Daniel Wu) as its lead. The show was a ratings hit, but received a mix response from critics. Nick Frost joined the cast in season two and proved a very popular addition to the fans of the series. The show's mythology was very loosely based on the classic Chinese text, Journey to the West. Each episode featured intricate martial arts fights that were staged and directed by legendary Hong Kong fight choreographers Huen Chiu Ku (aka Master Dee Dee Ku) and Andy Cheng. The series starred Daniel Wu, Marton Csokas, Emily Beecham, Aramis Knight and Orla Brady. The first season was filmed in New Orleans, but subsequent seasons were shot in and around Dublin, Ireland. Into The Badlands ran for 32 episodes and was cancelled due to a regime change at AMC Networks. 

In October 2020, Gough and Millar sold a series to Netflix based on the character of Wednesday Addams. The series was created by Gough and Millar but Tim Burton teamed with the duo as an executive producer and directed the first four episodes. Wednesday represents Burton's first foray into television and stars Jenna Ortega in the title role. The series also stars Catherine Zeta-Jones as Morticia Addams, Luis Guzman as Gomez Addams as well as Gwendoline Christie as Larissa Weems.

Millar and Gough created two other short-lived tv series; The Strip starring Sean Patrick Flannery, the ABC's reboot of Charlie's Angels. Both ran 8 episodes.

List of works

Film

Television

References

External links
 

1967 births
American male screenwriters
American television producers
Catholic University of America alumni
Living people
People from Leonardtown, Maryland
Showrunners
American television writers
USC School of Cinematic Arts alumni
American male television writers
Screenwriters from Maryland